Cool Cat is a fictional cartoon character created by director Alex Lovy for Warner Bros.-Seven Arts Animation. He was the final star of the original Warner Bros. theatrical cartoons. His first appearance was in an eponymous short in 1967. He was voiced by Larry Storch. Robert McKimson took over as director for the last two cartoons in this series.

In 1967, Jack L. Warner reorganized the Warner Bros. animation department, and hired Lovy away from Hanna-Barbera Productions to create new characters for Warners. The two that Lovy came up with were Cool Cat and Merlin the Magic Mouse.

Biography
Cool Cat is a hip Bengal tiger (whose design was very similar to that of The Pink Panther and Snagglepuss) who wore a stylish green beret and scarf. Unlike most other Looney Tunes characters, Cool Cat was unapologetically a product of his time. He spoke in 1960s-style beatnik slang and acted much like a stereotypical laid back 1960s teenager — he was often seen strumming a guitar or traveling cross-country in his dune buggy. One cartoon — McKimson's Bugged by a Bee — depicted him as an alumnus of "Disco Tech" playing varsity football against the long-haired team from "Hippie University".

However, most of Cool Cat's cartoons dealt with his encounters with Colonel Rimfire (also voiced by Storch), a fussy, British-accented big-game hunter armed with a blunderbuss. Rimfire essentially acted as the Elmer Fudd to Cool Cat's Bugs Bunny, but was used only by Lovy. Cool Cat bears the distinction of starring in the very last cartoon produced at the original Warner Bros. Cartoons studio prior to its shutdown: Injun Trouble in 1969.

His cartoons can easily be distinguished from most of the other Looney Tunes cartoons, as they feature an updated Looney Tunes logo with stylized animation, a 1967 remix of "The Merry-Go-Round Broke Down" by William Lava, and featuring the then-current Warner Bros.-Seven Arts logo (a combination of a simple W and 7 inside a stylized shield outline).

Cool Cat reappeared later in The Sylvester and Tweety Mysteries TV series, for which he was voiced by Joe Alaskey. He made brief cameos in most, if not all of the episodes, appearing on posters in the background, walking by in street scenes, etc. His appearances aren't entirely overlooked by the cast, as Tweety once responded to Cool Cat's appearance in the episode “Good Bird Hunting” with "You realize we had to stick this guy in someplace."

Cool Cat and Colonel Rimfire both appear in the 2000 direct-to-video movie Tweety's High-Flying Adventure which Colonel Rimfire had a major role which Granny makes a bet with him to see if Tweety is smarter than felines by touring the world and collecting 80 cats' pawprints in 80 days, while Cool Cat makes a cameo appearance where it is revealed that he was disguised as one of the members of the club Granny and Colonel Rimfire are members of. Cool Cat was voiced by Jim Cummings and Colonel Rimfire was voiced by Joe Alaskey.

He later appears in the Looney Tunes Cartoons short "Happy Birthday Bugs Bunny!" in the opening crowd shot.

Cool Cat, Colonel Rimfire, and Spooky the Ghost are the only W-7 Arts characters to make any further appearances, beyond the classic era shorts, to date.

Titles
Cool Cat (1967)
Big Game Haunt (1968)
Hippydrome Tiger (1968)
3 Ring Wing-Ding (1968)
Bugged by a Bee (1969)
Injun Trouble (1969)

References

External links
 Cool Cat at Toonopedia

Film characters introduced in 1967
Fictional tigers
Looney Tunes characters